Adippuliyur is a village in the Kudavasal taluk of Tiruvarur district, Tamil Nadu, India.

Demographics 

As per the 2001 census, Adippuliyur  had a total population of 1182 with 590 males and 592 females. The sex ratio was 1003. The literacy rate was 71.89.

References 

 

Villages in Tiruvarur district